Sheila Jeffreys (born 13 May 1948) is a former professor of political science at the University of Melbourne, born in England. A lesbian feminist scholar, she analyses the history and politics of human sexuality.

Jeffreys' argument that the "sexual revolution" on men's terms contributed less to women's freedom than to their continued oppression has both commanded respect and attracted intense criticism. She argues that women suffering pain in pursuit of beauty is a form of submission to patriarchal sadism; that transgender people reproduce oppressive gender roles and mutilate their bodies through sex reassignment surgery; and that lesbian culture has been negatively affected by emulating the sexist influence of the gay male subculture of dominant/submissive sexuality.

She is the author of several books about feminism and feminist history, including The Spinster and Her Enemies (1985), The Sexuality Debates (1987), Anticlimax (1990), Unpacking Queer Politics (2003), Beauty and Misogyny (2005), and Gender Hurts (2014).

Early life
Jeffreys was born to a working-class army family from London's East End. After attending an all-girls grammar school, she studied at Manchester University, then taught at a girls' boarding school. In 1973, Julie Bindel writes, Jeffreys decided "to abandon both heterosexuality and her feminine appearance". Jeffreys wrote in Beauty and Misogyny (2005):

Works
In 1979, Jeffreys helped write Love Your Enemy? The Debate Between Heterosexual Feminism and Political Lesbianism, along with other members of the Leeds Revolutionary Feminist Group. Its authors stated, "We do think ... that all feminists can and should be lesbians. Our definition of a political lesbian is a woman-identified woman who does not fuck men. It does not mean compulsory sexual activity with women."

Jeffreys was one of several contributors to The Sexual Dynamics of History: Men's Power, Women's Resistance, an anthology of feminist writings about gender relations published in 1983 by the London Feminist History Group. Jeffreys wrote the chapter on "Sex reform and anti-feminism in the 1920s".

In The Spinster and Her Enemies: Feminism and Sexuality 1880–1930, published in 1985, Jeffreys examines feminist involvement in the Social Purity movement at the turn of the century. In her 1990 work Anticlimax: A Feminist Perspective on the Sexual Revolution, Jeffreys offered a critique of the sexual revolution of the 1960s.

The Lesbian Heresy was published in 1993. In it Jeffreys criticises sadomasochistic practices involving women. One author involved in sadomasochism cites Jeffreys' views in this book as an example of the "simplistic and dualistic thinking" among anti-sadomasochism campaigners. Jeffreys describes sadomasochism as "male supremacist", a reenactment of heterosexual male dominance and women's oppression that glorifies violence and uses women's bodies as a sex aid, and as anti-lesbian and fascistic. The author claims that Jeffreys ignores that some heterosexual women may enjoy sadomasochistic activity, and that "tops" may be women who work hard to give their "bottoms" pleasure, rather than the passive recipients of sex in the way she describes.

The Industrial Vagina: The Political Economy of the Global Sex Trade was published in 2009. In it, Jeffreys describes the globalisation of the sex market, and calls marriage a form of prostitution. Jeffreys writes, "the right of men to women's bodies for sexual use has not gone, but remains an assumption at the basis of heterosexual relationships", and draws links between marriage and prostitution, such as mail-order brides, which she sees as a form of trafficking.

Views on gender
The University of Melbourne, Jeffreys' employer until her retirement in May 2015, listed her areas of expertise as:

In an interview, the writer Julie Bindel explains that Jeffreys believes sex reassignment surgery "is an extension of the beauty industry offering cosmetic solutions to deeper rooted problems" and that in a society without gender this would be unnecessary. Jeffreys has presented these views in various forums. In a 1997 article in the Journal of Lesbian Studies, for example, Jeffreys contended that "transsexualism should be seen as a violation of human rights." Jeffreys also argued that "the vast majority of transsexuals still subscribe to the traditional stereotype of women" and that by transitioning medically and socially, trans women are "constructing a conservative fantasy of what women should be. They are inventing an essence of womanhood which is deeply insulting and restrictive."

Jeffreys' opinions on these topics have been challenged by transgender activists. Roz Kaveney, a trans woman and critic of Jeffreys, wrote in The Guardian that Jeffreys and radical feminists who share her views are "acting like a cult." Kaveney compared Jeffreys' desire to ban sex reassignment surgery to the Catholic Church's desire to ban abortion, arguing that both proposals bear negative "implications for all women." Kaveney also criticised Jeffreys and her supporters for alleged "anti-intellectualism, emphasis on innate knowledge, fetishisation of tiny ideological differences, heresy hunting, conspiracy theories, rhetorical use of images of disgust, talk of stabs in the back and romantic apocalypticism."

Gender Hurts: A Feminist Analysis of the Politics of Transgenderism, a book cowritten by Jeffreys and Lorene Gottschalk, was published in April 2014. Timothy Laurie argued that the formalisation of social dynamics between men and women in Gender Hurts in terms of "strategies' and dividends" risks "confusing the continued existence of unequal economic exchanges (well documented by R.W. Connell) with the less predictable, but equally important, struggles over what gets labelled 'masculine' and 'feminine' and for what collective purposes".

In May 2014, the philosopher Judith Butler commented on Jeffreys' view that sex reassignment surgery is directly political. To Jeffreys' notion that reassignment surgery is a component of patriarchal control, Butler responded that "One problem with that view of social construction is that it suggests that what trans people feel about what their gender is, and should be, is itself 'constructed' and, therefore, not real. And then the feminist police comes along".

Jeffreys stated in a 2014 ABC Radio "Sunday Night Safran" program that transsexual women are either "homosexual men who don’t feel they can be homosexual in the bodies of men" or "heterosexual men who have a sexual interest in wearing women’s clothes and having the appearance of women", provoking criticism from members of the trans community for transphobia. Julia Serano has written that Sheila Jeffreys was an early feminist adopter of Ray Blanchard's autogynephilia theory. The concept of autogynephilia is used by trans-exclusionary radical feminists, or "gender critical" feminists, to imply that trans women are sexually deviant men.

In March 2018, addressing an audience at the House of Commons in a presentation titled “Transgenderism and the Assault on Feminism.”, she said "When men claim to be women…and parasitically occupy the bodies of the oppressed, they speak for the oppressed...". Her comments were referred to as a “fascist tactic to dehumanize” trans women by the journalist Shon Faye. 

Jeffreys co-founded the Women's Human Rights Campaign, which has been described as an anti-trans group.

Selected works
Books

 
 
 
 
 
 
 
 
 
 
 
 
 
 

Book chapters

 
 
 
 
 
 
 
 
 
 

Essays and pamphlets

  A pamphlet by Leeds Revolutionary Feminist Group. Pdf version.

References 

1948 births
Living people
20th-century atheists
21st-century atheists
Anti-pornography feminists
Anti-prostitution feminists
Atheist feminists
Australian atheists
Australian women academics
Australian women writers
Australian women's rights activists
Australian feminist writers
Australian political scientists
English women academics
British women's rights activists
English atheists
English feminist writers
English political scientists
English women non-fiction writers
Feminism and transgender
Historians of LGBT topics
Lesbian academics
Lesbian feminists
Australian lesbian writers
Political lesbians
Radical feminists
Women political scientists
English emigrants to Australia
Australian LGBT rights activists
English LGBT rights activists
English LGBT writers
Anti-prostitution activists in the United States
Academic staff of the University of Melbourne
University of Melbourne women
British lesbian writers